Lieutenant General Louis Patrick Lillywhite,  (born 23 February 1948) is a retired British Army physician and officer. He was Surgeon-General of the British Armed Forces from 2006 until December 2009. Between January 2017 and January 2022, he served as the first Master-General of the Army Medical Services

Early life
Born to William Henry Lillywhite and Annie Kate (née Vesey), Louis Lillywhite attended King Edward VI School in Lichfield and the University of Wales College of Medicine and the London School of Hygiene & Tropical Medicine.

Military career
Lillywhite was commissioned on 1 October 1968 as a second lieutenant (on probation). He was promoted to lieutenant on 7 July 1971 and to captain on 2 August 1972. He served as a medical officer and during the Gulf War in 1991, where he was mentioned in despatches. He was Surgeon-General of the British Armed Forces from 2006 until December 2009. He was appointed as an Officer of the Order of St John in 2007 and became an Honorary Member of the Society of Medical Consultants to the Armed Forces (of the USA) in 2009 and an Honorary Fellow of the Royal College of General Practitioners in 2010.

Lillywhite was appointed Member of the Order of the British Empire (MBE) in 1984, and Companion of the Order of the Bath (CB) in the 2009 New Year Honours.

Later life
In retirement, he became a member of the Bevan Commission (Wales) and a Senior Consulting Fellow at the Centre on Global Health Security of the Royal Institute of International Affairs, Chatham House. He was the Chief Medical Officer of St John Ambulance from 2010 - 2016, becoming a Commander of the Order of St John in 2016

References

External links
 Free Library info site
 MOD info. re Lillywhite

|-

1948 births
Living people
British Army lieutenant generals
Royal Army Medical Corps officers
English Roman Catholics
Officers of the Order of St John
Members of the Order of the British Empire
Alumni of the London School of Hygiene & Tropical Medicine
Alumni of the University of Wales
Companions of the Order of the Bath
British Army personnel of the Gulf War
Surgeons-General of the British Armed Forces
People from Lichfield
People educated at King Edward VI School, Lichfield